Mystic Pizza is a 1988 American romantic comedy-drama film directed by Donald Petrie in his feature directorial debut, and starring Annabeth Gish, Julia Roberts and Lili Taylor. It follows the coming-of-age of three young Portuguese-American friends who work at a pizza parlor in a seaside Connecticut town. The film received positive reviews, with Roger Ebert declaring at the time, "I have a feeling that Mystic Pizza may someday become known for the movie stars it showcased back before they became stars." It marked Matt Damon's film debut.

Plot
Sisters Kat and Daisy Araújo and their friend Jojo Barbosa are Portuguese-American teenage girls working as waitresses at Mystic Pizza, a pizza parlor owned by Leona in the fishing town of Mystic, Connecticut.

Kat and Daisy are total opposites. Kat, the younger sister, is an aspiring astronomer working at the planetarium in the Whaling Museum of the Mystic Seaport, and Yale University accepted her on a partial scholarship. Kat works at the restaurant and as a babysitter to raise money for school. Daisy's goal is to have as much fun as possible. Their mother is pleased with Kat, while often questioning Daisy's life choices.

Daisy meets Charles, a rich young man at a bar. The two are immediately attracted to each other and begin a relationship, much to her mother's dismay. At a family dinner, Charles's relatives unintentionally make insensitive comments about Daisy's ethnicity, and Charles overreacts. Daisy breaks up with him, accusing him of using her to rebel against his parents.

Kat finds herself infatuated with her employer Tim, an architect and Yale graduate, who hired her to babysit his four-year-old daughter Phoebe while his wife works in England. A relationship ultimately develops between them that she believes to be love, and they have sex. However, when his wife returns, Kat's illusions are shattered. Daisy consoles her devastated sister, and they bond.

Jojo fainted at her wedding to Bill because she had cold feet about making a lifetime commitment. Nonetheless, she wants to continue having sex with Bill until she is ready to be married. Bill eventually breaks up with her because she will not make a commitment.

A famous television food critic called "The Fireside Gourmet" unexpectedly visits Mystic Pizza. As Kat, Daisy, Jojo, and Leona watch from the counter, he takes a few bites of one pizza slice, jots notes in his notebook, and leaves after paying the check. His approval can do wonders for a restaurant, but they are not optimistic. However, a few days later he gives the pizzeria his highest rating, calling the pizza "superb". The restaurant phone immediately starts ringing, with Leona laughing as she informs the caller that no reservations are needed.

In the end, Tim brings Phoebe to Mystic Pizza because she wants to say goodbye to Kat. Tim gives her a check to help cover her tuition expenses, but she tears it up; she later accepts money from Leona. Jojo finally marries Bill, and Daisy and Charles reconcile at the wedding. The film ends with the three girls overlooking the water from the restaurant's balcony, reminiscing about their time together and wondering about the future.

Cast

Production and filming locations

The title of the film was inspired by a pizza shop in Mystic, Connecticut. Screenwriter Amy Holden Jones was summering in the area and chose Mystic Pizza as the focus of her story about the lives of three young waitresses.

Jones was set to direct, but was replaced by Petrie, who made his feature film directorial debut. The film was also Alfred Uhry's screenwriting debut.

Filming began October 12, 1987 and was due to last six weeks. The film's plot is set in Mystic, but most of the filming locations were in neighboring towns. The building used for the pizza restaurant was a converted home in Stonington Borough at 70 Water St. After the film's release, the real-life Mystic Pizza building in downtown Mystic was renovated to resemble the film set. The Windsor family home, the wedding reception restaurant, the Peg Leg Pub pool hall, and the fishing docks were also filmed in Stonington Borough. The hitchhiking incident takes place on North Main Street in Stonington Town. The Araújo home is in Pawcatuck, Connecticut; the lobster business and the wedding church are in Noank, Connecticut. Tim Travers' home and the Windsors' country club are in Watch Hill, Rhode Island. The most notable scenes that take place in Mystic were filmed at the Mystic Seaport planetarium and at the Mystic River Bascule Bridge.

Release
Goldwyn spent a company record $6.5 million on prints and advertising and other marketing activities, including tie-ins with Domino's Pizza and others. The film had 100 pre-opening screenings and premiered in Mystic, Connecticut on October 18, 1988. It was released on October 21, 1988.

Reception
The film received mostly favorable reviews, who praised the performances by the three lead actresses. It received "two thumbs up" from popular film critics Siskel and Ebert, giving particular praise to the three female leads, including Gish, whom Ebert likened to a "young Katharine Hepburn". Variety called it "a deftly told coming-of-age story about three young femmes as they explore their different destinies, mostly through romance, it’s genuine and moving, with enough edge to impress contemporary audiences."

On Rotten Tomatoes, the film has score of 78% based on reviews from 27 critics. The website's critics consensus reads: "Mystic Pizza is like its namesake food: it's cheesy, topped with romance, and rises to the occasion." On Metacritic, it has a score of 60% based on reviews from 10 critics, indicating "mixed or average reviews".

Home media
On January 13, 2009, Mystic Pizza and Say Anything... were released as a double feature on DVD. On April 5, 2011, Mystic Pizza was released on Blu-ray.

Musical adaptation
On January 22, 2019, it was announced that Mystic Pizza will be adapted into a stage musical. Melissa Etheridge will write the score, while Gordon Greenberg will direct and co-write the book with Sas Goldberg. This comes years after a fictional Broadway musical adaptation of the film had served as a plot point in the early part of season 2 of the NBC sitcom 30 Rock in 2007.

The world premiere of the musical version of Mystic Pizza was produced by Ogunquit Playhouse in Ogunquit, Maine from September 1, 2021, through October 2, 2021. The production, which featured songs by Melissa Etheridge and other pop songs of the 1980s, starred Krystina Alabado as Daisy, Gianna Yanelli as Jojo and Kyra Kennedy as Kat. The production was directed by Casey Hushion, featured a book by Sandy Rustin, choreography by Liz Ramos, musical supervision by Carmel Dean, with Kristin Stowell as music director. Executive producers were Michael Barra and Allison Bressi of Lively McCabe Entertainment.

See also 
 Little Italy, a 2018 romantic film also directed by Donald Petrie and set in a pizza parlor.
 Townies, a 1996 sitcom with a similar premise.

References

External links

 
 
 
 

1988 films
1988 comedy-drama films
1988 directorial debut films
1980s buddy comedy-drama films
1980s coming-of-age comedy-drama films
1980s female buddy films
1980s romantic comedy-drama films
American buddy comedy-drama films
American coming-of-age comedy-drama films
American female buddy films
American romantic comedy-drama films
Coming-of-age romance films
1980s English-language films
Films about adolescence
Films about sisters
Films directed by Donald Petrie
Films set in Connecticut
Films set in restaurants
Films shot in Connecticut
Mystic, Connecticut
The Samuel Goldwyn Company films
Films with screenplays by Amy Holden Jones
1980s American films